Devil and the Angel (French: La foire aux chimères) is a 1946 French drama film directed by Pierre Chenal and starring Madeleine Sologne, Erich von Stroheim and Louis Salou.

It was shot at the Billancourt Studios in Paris. The film's sets were designed by the art director Jean d'Eaubonne.

Cast
 Madeleine Sologne as Jeanne 
 Erich von Stroheim as Frank Davis 
 Louis Salou as Furet 
 Yves Vincent as Robert 
 Claudine Dupuis as Clara 
 Jean-Jacques Delbo as Lenoir 
 Margo Lion as Marie-Louise - la gouvernante de Frank 
 Pierre Labry as Gardel - un inspecteur 
 Georges Vitray as Le directeur de la banque 
 Marcel Mérovée as Doudou 
 Gustave Gallet as Le secrétaire de Frank Davis 
 Annette Poivre as La remplaçante 
 Eugène Frouhins as Le domestique 
 Dora Doll as La secrétaire de Lenoir 
 Howard Vernon as Un homme de main de Furet 
 Line Renaud as La chanteuse de cabaret

References

Bibliography 
 Arthur Lennig. Stroheim. University Press of Kentucky, 2003.

External links 
 

1946 films
1946 drama films
French drama films
1940s French-language films
Films directed by Pierre Chenal
Films shot at Billancourt Studios
French black-and-white films
1940s French films